Praveen B Menon is an Indian film  production controller who works mostly in the Malayalam film industry. He started his career in 2007. He has worked in more than fifty films including Malayalam, Tamil, Telugu and Kannada languages.

Filmography

References 

1977 births
Living people
Indian film producers